Oesterlein Machine Company-Fashion Frocks Inc. Complex is a registered historic building in Camp Washington, Cincinnati, Ohio, listed in the National Register on October 27, 2005.

Built in 1918, the complex was originally home to the Osterlein Machine tool plant. In the 1930s, the Fashion Frocks dress company acquired the property and manufactured women's clothing. Fashion Frocks also made parachutes during World War II. Currently, the complex is home to the American Sign Museum and loft apartments.

Historic uses 
Manufacturing Facility
Industrial Storage

Notes 

National Register of Historic Places in Cincinnati
Residential buildings in Cincinnati
Manufacturing plants in the United States
Warehouses on the National Register of Historic Places
Industrial buildings and structures on the National Register of Historic Places in Ohio